Mangraon is a mountain of the Garhwal Himalaya in Uttarakhand India. It is situated in the eastern rim of Nanda Devi Sanctuary on the watershed of Milam Glacier and Nanda Devi basin. It is joint 71st highest located entirely within the Uttrakhand. Nanda Devi, is the highest mountain in this category. It lies 1.8 km SSE of Deo Damla  its nearest higher neighbor. Rishi Pahar  lies 6.5 km North and it is 11.8 km NNE of Nanda Devi . It lies 9.5 km north of Lhatu Dhura .

Neighboring and subsidiary peaks
Neighboring or subsidiary peaks of Mangraon:
 Nanda Devi: 
 Rishi Pahar: 
 Lohar Deo: 
 Lhatu Dhura: 
 Rishi Kot: 
 Changabang: 
 Kalanka: 
 Saf Minal: 
 Bamchu:

Glaciers and rivers
It stands at the head of the western side of Mangraon Glacier. The glacier flows from west to east and joins Milam Glacier. Further down south east from the snout of Milam glacier emerges Goriganga River that later joins the Kali River at Jauljibi. On the western side Uttari Rishi Glacier joins Uttari Nanda Devi Glacier and drains into Rish Ganga. Rishi Ganga met with Dhauliganga River near Rini. Later Dhauli ganga met with Alaknanda at Vishnuprayag. Alaknanda River is one of the main tributaries of river Ganga that later joins Bhagirathi River the other main tributaries of river Ganga at Devprayag and became Ganga there after.

See also

 List of Himalayan peaks of Uttarakhand

References

Mountains of Uttarakhand
Six-thousanders of the Himalayas
Geography of Chamoli district